George Adlington Brandreth (October 16, 1828 – November 15, 1897) was an American lawyer, manufacturer and politician from New York.

Life
He was born in Leeds, England, to Benjamin Brandreth and Harriet (Smallpage) Brandreth. After the death of his second wife, Benjamin Brandreth emigrated in 1835 to the United States with his small children and settled in New York City where he manufactured his panacea "Brandreth's Pills." Due to the enormous increase in production, he removed in 1838 to Sing Sing (now Ossining), and established there the Brandreth Pill Factory.

George Brandreth studied law, was admitted to the bar, and practiced in Sing Sing. He married Virginia Gadsby Ward (d. 1872, a daughter of Congressman Aaron Ward), and they had four daughters: Eliza V. "Lily" (Brandreth) Larkin, Helen Ward (Brandreth) Potter (d. 1905), Fanny R. (Brandreth) Kane and Mary Watson (Brandreth) Borup.

On April 26, 1854, he was re-appointed Consul at Plymouth, England.

Originally a Democrat, he joined the War Democrats during the American Civil War, and became a Republican after the war. He was a member of the New York State Assembly (Westchester Co., 3rd D.) in 1864, 1865 and 1866. In May 1864, he was elected Chairman of the War Democratic State Committee.

After the death of his father in 1880, he took over the management of the pills factory. In 1884, he married Annie Ashton.

In 1892, he ran for Congress in the 16th District but was defeated by Democrat William Ryan.
 
He died of "fatty degeneration of the heart" on November 15, 1897, in Sing Sing.

George A. Brandreth's granddaughter Yvette Borup Andrews (1891-1959) was a photographer and filmmaker for several American Museum of Natural History expeditions to Central Asia.

References

Sources
Congressional Directory for 1852 (page 40)
LATEST INTELLIGENCE in NYT on April 27, 1854
Meeting of the State Committee of War Democrats in NYT on May 26, 1864
Death notice of his wife Virginia, in NYT on March 6, 1872
MAARIAGES IN SEPTEMBER; LARKIN - BRANDRETH... in NYT on September 26, 1883 (his daughter Lily V. Brandreth's marriage)
NEW YORK'S OFFICIAL VOTE in NYT on November 29, 1892
BRANDRETH'S WILL FILED in NYT on December 7, 1897
New York Civil List (1865; pages 473 and 475)

1828 births
1897 deaths
British emigrants to the United States
People from Ossining, New York
Members of the New York State Assembly
New York (state) Democrats
New York (state) Republicans
American consuls
19th-century American diplomats
19th-century American politicians